The First Cain Ministry was the 50th ministry of the Government of Victoria (Australia). It was led by the Premier of Victoria, John Cain of the Labor Party. The ministry was sworn in on 14 September 1943, but lasted less than four days. On 15 September, barely 24 hours after Governor of Victoria Sir Winston Dugan had sworn-in the cabinet, the government was defeated in the Legislative Assembly. Cain's motion to adjourn the parliament for over a week was defeated by the Country Party and the UAP, and Opposition Leader, Albert Dunstan, moved that Parliament resume the next day, giving notice that he would move a motion of no confidence against Cain's government, confident it would be carried by the CP–UAP alliance. Cain indicated that he would request a dissolution of parliament from the Governor, but if his request was refused, he would resign as Premier. On 17 September, Cain visited the Governor who refused his request for a dissolution—Cain then resigned and the Governor commissioned Dunstan to form a government, which was sworn in on Saturday 18 September.

Portfolios

References

Victoria (Australia) ministries
Australian Labor Party ministries in Victoria (Australia)
Ministries of George VI
1943 establishments in Australia
1943 disestablishments in Australia
Ministries established in 1943
Ministries disestablished in 1943